Sunrise Mountain High School is a public secondary school located in Peoria, Arizona, part of the Peoria Unified School District. The school opened its doors in August 1996. It is the district's second-smallest high school by enrollment, larger than only Cactus High School.

Overpopulation problem

Sunrise Mountain dealt with considerable overgrowth in the early and mid-2000s. With 2,440 students by 2005, many freshmen classes were pushed out to "Frosh Island", a former elementary school. Between each period a bus would shuttle students between "Frosh Island" and the main campus so that classes such as physical education, band, advanced science, and choir could be attended by freshmen. The use of this campus was discontinued by Sunrise Mountain following the end of the 2005-2006 school year. The overpopulation problem has been relieved by the creation of Liberty High School. Liberty is now larger than Sunrise Mountain by some 600 students.

Performing Arts
Sunrise Mountain has a marching band, concert band and jazz band. The jazz band competes yearly in the Northern Arizona University jazz competition. The Sunrise Mountain High School marching band competes in the Arizona Marching Band Association (AzMBA) under Division 3A and undergoes the nickname, "The Pride of Sunrise".

Sunrise Mountain has choral, orchestra, and piano programs representing the Peoria Unified School District. Sunrise Mountain is the only school in PUSD to have an orchestra. The choir has achieved superior in several festivals over the past years, including Superior with Distinction, which was won by the Varsity Choir at the NAU Jazz Festival in February 2017.

Sunrise Mountain is home to a drama program and a dance program. Every year, the thespians perform in the annual arts festival.

Sports
Sunrise Mountain has many various types of sports. Sunrise Mountain Mustangs have had a long-standing rivalry between fellow Peoria District schools, Liberty Lions, and Centennial Coyotes.

Fall
 Football [Male]
 Volleyball [Female]
 Cross Country [Male and Female]
 Golf [Male and Female]
 Swim [Male and Female]
 Badminton [Female]
 Marching Band [Male and Female]

Winter
 Basketball [Male and Female]
 Soccer [Male and Female]
 Wrestling [Male and Female]

Spring
 Boys' Baseball [Male]
 Girls' Softball [Female]
 Tennis [Male and Female]
 Track [Male and Female]
 Volleyball [Male]

Feeder schools
All of the following are K–8 schools:
 Apache
 Coyote Hills
 Frontier
 Parkridge

References

Educational institutions established in 1996
Public high schools in Arizona
Schools in Maricopa County, Arizona
School buildings completed in 1996
Education in Peoria, Arizona
1996 establishments in Arizona